Margaret of Cleves (1416–1444) was a German noblewoman. She was the eldest daughter of Adolph I, Duke of Cleves and his second wife Marie of Burgundy. She married 
 William III, Duke of Bavaria (1375–1435), having two children with him:
 Adolph (1434–1441);
 William (1435);
 Ulrich V, Count of Württemberg (1413–1480), having one child with him
 Catharina (1441–1497) - became a Premonstratensian then a Dominican nun in Würzburg, then finally ending up in the monastery under the protection of bishop Rudolf van Würzburg

1416 births
1444 deaths
People from the Duchy of Cleves
Duchesses of Bavaria
House of Wittelsbach
Remarried royal consorts